Ljudi i bogovi (trans. Humans and Gods) is the fourth studio album from Serbian and Yugoslav hard rock band Kerber, released in 1988.

Background and recording
Ljudi i bogovi was recorded during 1988 in PGP-RTB Studio V and produced by Đorđe Petrović. After the recording of the band's previous album, Seobe (Migrations), keyboardist Branislav Božinović had to leave the band because of his mandatory stint in the Yugoslav army, and was replaced by Milorad Džmerković for the promotional tour, but by the time of Ljudi i bogovi recording, his army service had ended and he had rejoined the group. All of the lyrics on the album were written by the band's old associate Duško Arsenijević, Ljudi i bogovi being the band's first album with all lyrics written by him, with some of the lyrics dealing with political topics. The album was titled after a verse from the song "Manifest" ("Manifesto").

Ljudi i bogovi was the band's last album recorded with original bass guitarist Zoran Žikić. He would leave the band in the summer of 1988 and would be replaced by Branko Isaković.

Track listing

Personnel
Goran Šepa - vocals
Tomislav Nikolić - guitar
Branislav Božinović - keyboard
Zoran Žikić - bass guitar
Dragoljub Đuričić - drums

Additional personnel
Marina Popović - backing vocals
Vesna Popović - backing vocals
Katarina Gojković - backing vocals
Đorđe Petrović - producer
Vladimir Negovanović - recorded by
Ivan Ćulum - cover design
Gordan Škondrić - photography

Reception and legacy
The album did not repeat the success of the band's previous albums, which brought numerous hits. Nevertheless, the songs "Svet se brzo okreće" and the ballad "Na raskršću" became hits.

In 2021, the song "Manifest" was ranked 79th on the list of 100 Greatest Yugoslav Hard & Heavy Anthems published by web magazine Balkanrock.

References

Ljudi i bogovi at Discogs

External links

Kerber albums
1988 albums
PGP-RTB albums